In Greek mythology, Cyllene, also spelled Kyllene, is the Naiad or Oread nymph and the personification of Mount Cyllene in Arcadia, the region in Greece where the god of travelers and shepherds Hermes was born and brought up. Cyllene is said to have been Hermes' nurse while he was growing up.

Family 
According to Pseudo-Apollodorus, Cyllene and Pelasgus had a son named Lycaon, a king of the Arcadians. Otherwise, the latter's mother was either the Oceanid Meliboea or Deianira, daughter of another Lycaon. According to others she was Lycaon's wife instead, but in others versions of the myth, his wife was called Nonacris.

Mythology 

In the Homeric Hymn 4 to Hermes, Hermes stayed in cave with his mother Maia, but in Sophocles's lost satyr play Ichneutae ("trackers") it was Cyllene who nurtured the infant god. The titular satyrs, who are looking for Apollo's missing cattle (that Hermes stole) on the orders of the god, confront Cyllene who gives and account of Zeus and Maia's amorous relationship, how he deceived his wife Queen Hera and how quickly the infant is growing, scaring even her. As the sound of the lyre echoes, the satyrs marvel at the sound, and Cyllene explains to them the construction of the instrument, leaving them baffled and incredulous. Cyllene, when describing the lyre Hermes invented, offers a humorous riddle, saying that the son of Zeus has granted a new voice to a body that is dead, before revealing she is talking about a dead tortoise. The satyrs next accuse Hermes of stealing Apollo's sacred cattle; Cyllene replies that it is unthinkable to accuse a son of Zeus himself of such a petty crime, and defends Hermes by pointing out there is no tendency for theft in either the paternal or maternal side of Hermes' family. The papyrus on which the fragmentary play is preserved breaks off as Apollo arrives and what happens next is not clear.

See also 

 Chiron
 Tethys
 Kourotrophos
 Pan

Footnotes

Notes

References 
 Apollodorus, The Library with an English Translation by Sir James George Frazer, F.B.A., F.R.S. in 2 Volumes, Cambridge, MA, Harvard University Press; London, William Heinemann Ltd. 1921. ISBN 0-674-99135-4. Online version at the Perseus Digital Library. Greek text available from the same website.
 Dionysus of Halicarnassus, Roman Antiquities. English translation by Earnest Cary in the Loeb Classical Library, 7 volumes. Harvard University Press, 1937-1950. Online version at Bill Thayer's Web Site
 Dionysius of Halicarnassus, Antiquitatum Romanarum quae supersunt, Vol I-IV. . Karl Jacoby. In Aedibus B.G. Teubneri. Leipzig. 1885. Greek text available at the Perseus Digital Library.
 
 Maurus Servius Honoratus, In Vergilii carmina comentarii. Servii Grammatici qui feruntur in Vergilii carmina commentarii; recensuerunt Georgius Thilo et Hermannus Hagen. Georgius Thilo. Leipzig. B. G. Teubner. 1881. Online version at the Perseus Digital Library.
 
 
 Smith, William, A Dictionary of Greek and Roman Biography and Mythology. London. John Murray: printed by Spottiswoode and Co., New-Street Square and Parliament Street.

External links 
 CYLLENE on The Theoi Project

Oreads
Nymphs
Arcadian mythology
Personifications in Greek mythology
Mountain goddesses
Mythological Greek tutors of gods
Deeds of Hermes
Naiads
Nature goddesses
Sea and river goddesses